Brownbul may refer to:

 Bristle-necked brownbul, alternate name for a species of bird found in eastern and south-eastern Africa
 Northern brownbul, a species of bird found in eastern and south-eastern Africa
 Nyasa terrestrial brownbul, a subspecies of bird found in eastern and south-eastern Africa
 Terrestrial brownbul, a species of bird found in eastern and south-eastern Africa

Birds by common name
Pycnonotidae